The Colegio de Santa Cruz in Tlatelolco, Mexico City, is the first and oldest European school of higher learning in the Americas and the first major school of interpreters and translators in the New World. It was established by the Franciscans on January 6, 1536 with the intention, as is generally accepted, of preparing Native American boys for eventual ordination to the Catholic priesthood. Students trained in the Colegio were important contributors to the work of Franciscan Bernardino de Sahagún in the creation of his monumental twelve-volume General History of the Things of New Spain, often referred to as the Florentine Codex.  The failure of the Colegio had long-lasting consequences, with scholar Robert Ricard saying that "[h]ad the College of Tlatelolco given the country even one [native] bishop, the history of the Mexican Church might have been profoundly changed."

History

The Colegio was built by the Franciscan order on the initiative of the President of the Audiencia Sebastián Ramírez de Fuenleal, Bishop Don Juan de Zumárraga, and Viceroy Don Antonio de Mendoza on the site of an Aztec school, for the sons of nobles (in Nahuatl: Calmecac). It was inaugurated on January 6, 1536, however, it had been a functioning school since August 8, 1533.

While Bishop of Santo Domingo, Ramírez de Fuenleal had encouraged the Franciscans to teach the sons of Indians grammar in their native language of Nahuatl. Franciscan Arnaldo de Basccio began the task with considerable success, which gave support to the project of establishing an institute of higher learning. Ramírez de Fuenleal urged the crown to provide funds to establish and support such an institution. The Franciscans had already established primary schools prior to the Colegio, one at Texcoco, established by Fray Pedro de Gante in 1523 and the other by the leader of the First Twelve Franciscans, Martín de Valencia in Mexico-Tenochtitlan in 1525. Still others were founded by Franciscans in this early period.  These schools for Indian and mestizo boys taught basic literacy, but also singing, instruction in how to help with the mass, and sometimes manual labor. The primary education of Indian girls was also a concern and schools were established in Mexico City, Texcoco and six other locations lasting only for a decade.

But not until the establishment of the Colegio de Santa Cruz were sons of Indian men given higher education. Bishop Juan de Zumárraga was a supporter of the establishment of the Colegio, but credited  Fuenleal and the crown for the accomplishment. The Colegio was inaugurated on January 6, 1536, the feast of the Epiphany,  deliberately chosen for its symbolism of calling the gentiles to the true faith. The establishment of such a school to train young men for the priesthood was highly controversial, with opposition especially coming from Dominican friars and articulated by the head of that order, Fray Domingo Betanzos.  Franciscan Bernardino de Sahagún wrote a strong defense of the capacity of the Indians, countering the opinions of those who doubted the Indians' ability not only to learn Latin grammar, but to speak, and compose in it. He went on to refute concerns about the possibility of the Indians spreading heresy.  Betanzos in his opposition to the Colegio said that Native Americans who knew Latin could expose the ignorance of the existing European priests, an argument that perhaps unwittingly did the same.

The original purpose of the Colegio was to educate a male indigenous priesthood, and so pupils were selected from the most prestigious families of the Aztec ruling class. These young men were taught to be literate in Nahuatl, Spanish and Latin, and received instruction in Latin in music, rhetoric, logic, and philosophy, and indigenous medicine. One student educated at the Colegio was Nahua botanist Martín de la Cruz, who wrote the Libellus de Medicinalibus Indorum Herbis, an illustrated herbal.

Actual instruction at the Colegio was by two Franciscans at a time, aided by Indian assistants. Among the teachers were notable scholars and grammarians such as Franciscans Andrés de Olmos, Alonso de Molina and Bernardino de Sahagún, all of whom have made important contributions to the study of both the Classical Nahuatl language and the ethnography and anthropology of Mesoamerica. Other Franciscans who taught there were Fray Juan de Goana, Fray Francisco de Bustamante, Fray García de Cisneros, Fray Arnaldo de Basaccio, and Fray Juan Focher. Fray Juan de Torquemada also served as a teacher and administrator at the Colegio. When recollecting historical and ethnographical information for the elaboration of the Florentine Codex, Sahagún used his trilingual students to elicit information from the Aztec elders and to transcribe it in Spanish and Nahuatl and to illuminate the manuscripts.

Opened with great fanfare, the ceremony was attended by Viceroy Mendoza, Bishop Juan de Zumárraga, and the President of the Audiencia, Sebastián Ramírez de Fuenleal with a great crowd to view the proceedings.  Fray Alonso de Herrera preached the sermon at the opening Mass. Following the religious ceremony, there was a banquet hosted by Zumárraga for guests and the first pupils, chosen from the convent of San Francisco de México.

Although there was great support from many sectors (excluding the Dominicans who objected to the founding of the Colegio), the physical structure was at first quite modest for lack of funds and later a stone house was built.

The first sixty male students was a small cohort of sons of noble families; there was tremendous need for many more pupils, so the Franciscans actively recruited others from important towns in central Mexico, two or three boys 10 to 12 years of age.  The pupils lived in the Colegio in very modest circumstances.  A common eating area and sleeping quarters with beds being only a mat and a blanket placed on individual wooden platforms to keep pupils from the damp floor.  Some important pupils trained at the school were Antonio de Valeriano, who was the most prominent of those who collaborated with Sahagún. Spanish judge Alonso de Zorita, author of Life and Labor in Ancient Mexico: the Brief and Summary Relation of the Lords of New Spain was aided by the translations of Pablo Nazareno, a former pupil at the Colegio.

The Franciscans continued to teach at the Colegio, but could not afford to keep up the building or other expenses, so they turned it over to the crown shortly after the Colegio opened in 1536.  In 1546 the Franciscans gave up any management of the property and it was turned over to the pupils and former pupils to run.  By 1550 due to poor management, the buildings were falling down and pupils had to become day students.  In 1555, Indians were forbidden from ordination to the priesthood, so that the original purpose of the school to train a native priesthood was ended.  In the seventeenth century when Franciscan Augustín de Vetancurt was writing, the Colegio was a complete ruin.

In modern Mexico city the Plaza de las Tres Culturas, close to the location of the Colegio, commemorates this particularly interesting part of the cultural history of Mexico.

The accompanying illustration shows the church of Santiago which still exists, together with part of the conventual buildings (now a library), visible to the right of the church.

Legacy
The Colegio was founded in the early sixteenth century in a period of great optimism about the capacity of the Indians and the prospects for their being ordained as Catholic priests.  Its failure in the late sixteenth century was a serious one.  According to Robert Ricard, the "error prevented the Church from striking deep roots in the nation, gave it the appearance and character of a foreign institution, and kept it dependent upon the mother country."  There were some Indian men ordained in the later colonial period, but they were few and never held high posts.  American-born Spaniards, criollos, were trained in Mexican seminaries, but there was no significant native clergy.

The training of elite young men at the Colegio in grammar, rhetoric, and theology did, however, enormously aid the Franciscans in their efforts to evangelize the Indians and to record indigenous history and culture in texts that remain fundamental to the understanding of Nahua culture.

See also
Plaza de las Tres Culturas
Tlatelolco (archaeological site)
List of colonial churches in Mexico City
List of oldest buildings in the Americas

References

Further reading

Baudot, Georges. Utopia and History in Mexico: The First Chronicles of Mexican Civilization, 1520-1569. Translated by Bernardo R. Ortiz de Montellano and Thelma Ortiz de Montellano.  Boulder: University of Colorado Press 1995.
Brand, Donald, D., "Where is the Oldest University in the New World?", New Mexico Anthropologist, vol. 4, No. 4 (Oct.-Dec. 1940), pp. 61–63
Estarellas, Juan: "The College of Tlatelolco and the Problem of Higher Education for Indians in 16th Century Mexico". History of Education Quarterly, Vol. 2, No. 4 (Dec., 1962) pp. 234–243
Gómez Canedo, Lino. La educación de los marginados durante la época colonial: Escuelas y colegios para indios y mestizos en la Nueva España. cap. IV "Enseñanza superior: Tlatelolco". Mexico: Editorial Porrúa 1982.
Mathes, Michael, 1985, "The Americas' first academic library Santa Cruz de Tlatelolco", Sacramento, California State Library
Maxwell, Judith M, and Craig A Hanson, 1992, "Introduction" Of the Manner of Speaking That the Old Ones Had: Arte Para aprender la Lengua Mexicana 1547. University of Utah Press, Salt Lake City.
Ocaranza, F.El imperial colegio de indios de Santa Cruz de Santiago Tlatelolco. Mexico, 1934, n.p.
Ricard, Robert. 1966. The Spiritual Conquest of Mexico: An Essay on the Apostolate and the Evangelizing Methods of the Mendicant Orders in New Spain, 1523-1572. Translated by Lesley Byrd Simpson. Berkeley: University of California Press 1966. Originally published in French in 1933.
SilverMoon. 2007. The Imperial College of Tlatelolco and the emergence of a new Nahua intellectual elite in New Spain (1500–1760). Doctoral Dissertation. Duke University. ProQuest. 
Steck, F.B. ''El primer colegio de América, Santa Cruz de Tlatelolco. Mexico: Centro de Estudios Franciscanos, 1944.

Universities in Mexico City
Franciscan universities and colleges
Cuauhtémoc, Mexico City
Colegio de Santa Cruz de Tlatelolco
1536 establishments in New Spain
Educational institutions established in the 1530s
Santiago Tlatelolco
Roman Catholic churches completed in 1536
Baroque architecture in Mexico
16th-century Roman Catholic church buildings in Mexico